Doris Colleen  Houck (September 28, 1921 December 14, 1965) was an American model, 1940s Florentine Gardens performer and film actress on contract with Columbia Studios. She appeared in 25+ films from 1945-1947. In the 1950s she was a published BMI contract songwriter.

Biography 
Houck was the daughter of Mr. and Mrs. George Houck. In 1942, she changed her last name to Howe. She was a native of Wallace, Idaho.

Houck is familiar to modern viewers for her roles in several Three Stooges short subjects, such as G.I. Wanna Home. She is best remembered as the aggressive girlfriend who throws Shemp Howard's head into a vise until he decided to marry her in Brideless Groom:

 Shemp: "Stop, I'm getting a headache!"
 Houck: "I'll fix your headache!"
Houck also performed in night clubs.

In 1955, Houck signed an exclusive seven-year songwriting contract with Arthur Valanda, manager of T-C Publishing Corporation.

Personal life 
Houck was married to San Antonio, Texas oil man Edward G. Nealis; they divorced in May 1948. On January 6, 1950, Houck married Los Angeles police officer and Hollywood fixer Fred Otash, in Beverly Hills. They were divorced twice: the first order was vacated following a November 1950 reconciliation, and their second and final divorce was granted on June 19, 1952.

Death 
Houck died suddenly on December 14, 1965. Her gravesite is in Westwood Memorial Park in Los Angeles.

Selected filmography
 Brideless Groom (1947)
 Little Miss Broadway (1947)
 G.I. Wanna Home (1946)
 Shadowed (1946)
 Landrush (1946)
 Heading West (1946)
 Two-Fisted Stranger (1946)
 Life with Blondie  (1945)

References

External links

1921 births
1965 deaths
20th-century American actresses
American film actresses
Actresses from Idaho
People from Wallace, Idaho